West Sulawesi is a province of Indonesia. It is located on the western side of Sulawesi island. It covers an area of 16,787.18 km2, and its capital is Mamuju. The 2010 Census recorded a population of 1,158,651, while that in 2020 recorded 1,419,228.

The province was established in 2004, having been split off from South Sulawesi.

Geography 
The province is on the island of Sulawesi (formerly Celebes) and includes the regencies (kabupaten) of Polewali Mandar, Mamasa, Majene, Mamuju, Central Mamuju and Pasangkayu (formerly called North Mamuju), which used to be part of South Sulawesi. The area of the province is 16,787.18 km2.

Economy 

Its economy consists mainly of mining, agriculture and fishing. Its capital is Mamuju.

Archaeological findings 
On 11 December 2019, a team of researchers led by Dr. Maxime Aubert announced the discovery of the oldest hunting scenes in prehistoric art in the world which is more than 44,000 years old from the limestone cave of Leang Bulu’ Sipong 4. Archaeologists determined the age of the depiction of hunting a pig and buffalo thanks to the calcite ‘popcorn’, different isotope levels of radioactive uranium and thorium.

Administrative divisions

West Sulawesi Province is divided into six regencies: Polewali Mandar, Mamuju, Pasangkayu, Mamasa, Majene, and Central Mamuju The sixth regency - Central Mamuju Regency (Kabupaten Mamuju Tengah) - was cut out of the existing Mamuju Regency on 14 December 2012.

Demographics
Its population at the 2010 census was 1,158,651 increasing at 2.67% annually. Of those 171,356 are classified as below the poverty line of Indonesia.

Religion

See also

Polewali-Mamasa

References

 
2004 establishments in Indonesia
Provinces of Indonesia
States and territories established in 2004